Pune 7 Aces (or 7 ACES – Pune) is a franchise badminton team based in Pune that plays in the Premier Badminton League. The franchise was formed in 2018 and has competed only in the season of 2018–19. The team is owned by Indian actress Tapsee Pannu and KRI Entertainment. The team is coached by Mathias Boe.

Current squad 
The squad for the PBL season five is:

Indian players 

  Arjun M.R.
  Chirag Shetty
  Mithun Manjunath
  Rituparna Das

Overseas players 

  Chris Adcock
  Gabby Adcock
  Tse Ying Suet
  Hendra Setiawan
  Kazumasa Sakai
  Loh Kean Yew
  Lee Zii Jia 
  Vũ Thị Trang

Season 4 

Season four of PBL was the first season for Pune 7 Aces. The team had Olympic Champion Carolina Marin in their squad for the season. They finished fifth.

Squad 
Squad that played season four:

  Carolina Marín
  Chirag Shetty
  Mathias Boe
  Vladimir Ivanov
  Line Kjærsfeldt
  Lakshya Sen
  Brice Leverdez
  Sony Dwi Kuncoro
  Ajay Jayaram
  Prajakta Sawant

Results

References

External links 

 

Premier Badminton League teams
Sport in Pune